Franny Choi (born February 11, 1989) is an American writer, poet and playwright.

Personal life
Choi lived in Northampton, Massachusetts and now resides in Greenfield, Massachusetts. Her fascination with poetry began when she was in the third or fourth grade. She enjoyed the action of ordering words together in such a way that they provided profound meaning. As her love for poetry grew, she began to identify and to use poetry as a means of coping with real life experiences. In high school, Choi was introduced to poet Allen Ginsberg and fell in love with poetry's spoken form. In college, she joined a group for marginalized spoken poets, called WORD!, which was her introduction to the world of slam poetry. She has published poetry focusing on social activism and equality, which has won awards and been highlighted in many journals and magazines. She has competed in many slam poetry competitions, where she became increasingly known as a poet.

Education and career
Choi's parents are Choi Inyeong and Nam Songeun. She is Korean-American. She graduated from Brown University with a B.A. in Literary Arts and Ethnic Studies in 2011 and received an M.F.A. from the Helen Zell Writers' Program at the University of Michigan in Poetry. After graduating, she became a co-director of the Providence Poetry Slam. She founded the Dark Noise Collective with Fatimah Asghar, Danez Smith, Jamila Woods, Nate Marshall, and Aaron Samuels in 2012.

Currently, Choi is working for Hyphen Magazine, a non-profit Asian culture publication, as News Editor. She is also a co-host with Danez Smith of the podcast VS. She was a Gaius Charles Bolin Fellow in English at Williams College; in 2022 she joined the undergraduate Literature Faculty at Bennington College.

Awards
Choi is a two-time winner of the Rust-Belt Poetry Slam.

Activism
Choi promotes social activism through her poetry and writing. In her poem "Whiteness Walks Into A Bar," she brings to light the institutionalized racism in the United States. She also advocates for feminism through her poetry, such as in "furiosa." Choi curated a series of video poems by 12 queer Asian American and Pacific Islander poets for the Smithsonian Asian Pacific American Center.

Bibliography

Books
Floating, Brilliant, Gone (Button Poetry, 2014)
Soft Science (Alice James Books, 2019)
The World Keeps Ending, and the World Goes On (Ecco, 2022)

Chapbooks
Death by Sex Machine (Sibling Rivalry Press, 2017)

References

External links
 

1989 births
American writers of Korean descent
Brown University alumni
Living people
American LGBT people of Asian descent
Writers from Providence, Rhode Island
Poets from Rhode Island
American poets of Asian descent
American LGBT poets
LGBT people from Rhode Island
21st-century American women writers
21st-century American poets
American women poets
University of Michigan alumni